Christopher Robert Broach (born September 5, 1976 in Madison, Wisconsin) is one of the guitarists/vocalists in the 1990s emo band Braid. Broach joined Braid in 1994, recording his guitar parts on the band's first 7-inch release a week later.

Career
While a member of Braid, Broach also played in The Firebird Suite, and continued playing in what became The Firebird Band after Braid split up. He played guitar for Life at Sea on the album Is there a signal coming through?, and fronted the band L'Spaerow which put out one album on his own label, Lucid Records, which he founded in 2002. Broach, along with Chris Common of These Arms Are Snakes and former Hey Mercedes guitarist Mike Schumaker, were involved in a project entitled The Blakhiv. They released their first EP on Lucid Records in 2006.

In 2015, Broach raised $15,000 in a Kickstarter campaign to record a new Firebird album. The funds covered recording, mixing, producing, and mastering the record, which was produced by Will Yip. Broach and Steve Znavor streamed the new record at Billboard Magazine under the name Sunset, but changed the name to SNST just prior to the digital release on April 28, 2017.

Discography

Albums 

 SacHead – Our World (Playing Field Recordings, 1993) Cassette Only
 Braid – Frankie Welfare Boy Age Five (Divot Records, 1995) – CD/Double LP
 Braid – The Age of Octeen (Mud Records, 1996) – CD/LP
 Braid – Frame & Canvas (Polyvinyl, 1998) – CD/LP
 Braid – Lucky To Be Alive (Glue Factory Records, 2000) – live CD/Double LP
 The Firebird Band – The Setting Sun and Its Satellites – (The Mintaka Conspiracy/Cargo Music/Headhunter, 2000) – CD/LP
 L' Spaerow – L'Spaerow CD – (Lucid Records, 2003) – CD
 Life at Sea – Is There A Signal Coming Through? – (Lucid Records, 2003) – CD
 The Firebird Band – The City at Night – (Bifocal Media/Lucid Records, 2004) CD
 Braid – No Coast, (Topshelf Records, 2014) – CD/LP
 SNST - "Turn Out the Lights", (City at Night Records / Rhyme & Reason Records, 2017) - LP 
SNST - "It's Hard To Be Loved By You", (City at Night Records, 2020) - LP

Singles and EPs

 Braid – "Rainsnowmatch" 7" (Enclave /Polyvinyl, 1994) – single
 Braid – "I'm Afraid of Everything"/"Radish White Icicle"/"Now I'm Exhausted" 7" (Grand Theft Autumn, 1995) – single
 Braid – "Niagara"/"That Car Came Out of Nowhere" 7" ("Grand Theft Autumn", 1995) – single
 Braid / "Corm Split" 7" (Polyvinyl, 1997) – single
 Braid – "First Day Back"/"Hugs From Boys" 7" (Polyvinyl, 1998) – single
 "Always Something There To Remind Me" (Split 7" w/ Burning Airlines) – (DeSoto Records, 1998) single
 The Firebird Suite – "New York" 7" – (The Mintaka Conspiracy, 1998) – single
 The Firebird Project – "Feel Alright CD" – (The Mintaka Conspiracy, 1999) – EP
 Braid – "Please Driver Faster", (Polyvinyl, 1999) – single
 The Firebird Band – "The Drive" – (Cargo/Headhunter, 2001) – EP
 The Blakhiv – "Any Way She Wants It" – (Lucid Records, 2006) – EP
 Chris Broach – "How Well You Know Me" – (City at Night Records, 2009) – digital single
 Chris Broach – "Beautiful Spaces" – (City at Night Records, 2009) – digital single
 The Firebird Band – "Say Hello" – (Mind Over Matter Records / City at Night Records, 2010) –  7" / digital EP
 Chris Broach – "Madison" – (City at Night Records, 2010) – digital EP
Braid – "Closer To Closed" – (Polyvinyl, 2011) – EP
The Firebird Band – "Green" – (City at Night Records, 2011) – digital EP
The Firebird Band – "Balinese Skies" – (City at Night Records, 2011) – digital EP
Chris Broach – "Juarez The Hero / Just Like A Duo" – (City at Night Records, 2011) – digital EP
The Firebird Band – "Night Remixes" – (City at Night Records, 2011) – digital EP
Chris Broach – "Toy" – (City at Night Records, 2011) – digital single
Braid – "Braid + Balance + Composure" (Split 7" w/ Balance + Composure) – (No Sleep Records / Polyvinyl, 2013) – single
 SNST – "National Monument" – (City at Night Records, 2016) – digital single
SNST – "Sunset" or "Remember How It Ends" – (Broken World Media / City at Night Records, 2017) – CD / digital EP
Mass Energy – "Can We Dance?" – (City at Night Records, 2017) – digital single
Chris Broach – "Break It Up" – (City at Night Records, 2018) – digital single
Chris Broach – "Pick Up A Gun" – (City at Night Records, 2018) – digital single
SNST – "Heart Will Fail You" – (City at Night Records, 2019) – digital single
SNST – "It's Hard To Be Loved (By You)" – (City at Night Records, 2019) – digital single
SNST – "What's Evil About?" – (City at Night Records, 2019) – digital single
SNST – "Worth It" – (City at Night Records, 2019) – digital single
SNST – "White Collar Villain" – (City at Night Records, 2019) – digital single
SNST – "Chaos Is Meant To Be" – (City at Night Records, 2020) – digital single
SNST – "Be Afraid" – (City at Night Records, 2020) – digital single
SNST – "Catastrophe" – (City at Night Records, 2020) – digital single
SNST – "Solid Ground" – (City at Night Records, 2020) – digital single
SNST – "I 4 I" – (City at Night Records, 2020) – digital single
SNST – "Funky Fresh" – (City at Night Records, 2020) – digital single

Compilations 

 Braid – Movie Music Vol. 1, (Polyvinyl, 2000) – compilation CD/Double LP
 Braid – Movie Music Vol. 2, (Polyvinyl, 2000) – compilation CD/Double LP
 The Firebird Suite - Archives – (Lucid Records, 2003) - CD
 Chris Broach – "Lost Years: Volume 11" – (City at Night Records, 2018) – digital LP

Appearances

 Campanula Blue – "I Love Kerrazo" – guest vocals (Core For Care, 1996)
 Braid – "Trompe Le Monde" from Where Is My Mind? A Tribute To The Pixies (Glue Factory Records, 1999)
 The Firebird Band – "She Wears He-Harem" from A Tribute To Shudder To Think (2003)

VHS/DVD

 Actuality of Thought (BiFocal Media, 2001) – VHS
 Braid – Killing A Camera (Bifocal Media, 2001 VHS, 2004 DVD) – DVD

References

Sources
Grubbs, E. (2008). Post: A look at the Influence of Post-Hardcore, 1985–2007. iUniverse. New York.

External links
Chris Broach's label website - City at Night Records
SNST's website
Chris Broach Interview (2011)

1976 births
Living people
American rock singers
American rock guitarists
American male guitarists
People from Wheeling, Illinois
Singers from Chicago
Guitarists from Chicago
21st-century American male singers
21st-century American singers
21st-century American guitarists